Georgi Georgiyevich Koshelev (1930 – 1996) was a Soviet production designer and set decorator. Koshelev has worked as a set decorator at Mosfilm in 1961 – 1986. He was nominated for an Academy Award for Best Art Direction for his work on the epic film War and Peace (1967).
After leaving Mosfilm due to illness, he was engaged in painting and iconography, drawing posters for films.

References

External links
 
 
 

Set decorators
Soviet production designers
1930 births
1996 deaths